Ethan Hill (born 12 September 2002) is an English professional footballer who plays as a midfielder for  club Mansfield Town.

Playing career
Hill turned professional at Mansfield Town in May 2021. He made his senior debut on 31 August under the stewardship of Nigel Clough, in a 3–1 defeat at Harrogate Town in the EFL Trophy.

Style of play
Mansfield Town academy manager Richard Cooper described Hill as "a very technically astute midfield player... a gifted midfield player [with] an eye for a pass".

Statistics

References

2002 births
Living people
Footballers from Leicester
English footballers
Association football midfielders
Nottingham Forest F.C. players
Mansfield Town F.C. players
English Football League players